The Texas Renegades were a Junior A Tier III ice hockey team, based in North Richland Hills, Texas. Initially joining the league as the Cajun Catahoulas, the team moved in for the 2008–09 season to North Richland Hills, Texas to become the Texas Renegades. The team lasted in North Richland Hills for one season before moving on to Rio Rancho, New Mexico to become the New Mexico Renegades.

References

Ice hockey teams in Texas
North Richland Hills, Texas
Sports teams in the Dallas–Fort Worth metroplex
2008 establishments in Texas
2009 disestablishments in Texas
Ice hockey clubs established in 2008
Ice hockey clubs disestablished in 2009